Horacio Zeballos Jr. (born 27 April 1985) is an Argentine professional tennis player. His career-high singles ranking is world No. 39, achieved in March 2013, and his career-high doubles ranking is world No. 3, achieved in September 2019. In doubles, he has reached the men's doubles finals at the 2019 US Open and Wimbledon 2021 alongside Marcel Granollers. In singles, he has reached the fourth round at the French Open, doing so in 2017.

Zeballos won his first ATP title at the 2013 VTR Open in Chile on 10 February. In the final, he beat Rafael Nadal, becoming one of only four players (with Roger Federer, Novak Djokovic and Andy Murray) to beat Nadal in a clay-court final.

He has also reached the final in the St. Petersburg Open in Russia, losing to Ukrainian Sergiy Stakhovsky. He reached the doubles final at the Movistar Open in Santiago, Chile, in 2010 with partner Potito Starace. They lost to top seeds Łukasz Kubot and Oliver Marach. He won the title in doubles at the Copa Telmex with Sebastián Prieto. Zeballos won the 2009 ATP Newcomer of the Year award.

Personal life
Zeballos is an Argentine of Spanish descent. He enjoys music, ping-pong, and swimming. His father is also named Horacio Zeballos, and his mother is named Carolina. He has one sister, Carolina Jr. His favorite surface is clay, and Alejandro Lombardo coaches him.

Tennis career

2008-2009: First ATP singles final
Zeballos competed primarily on the ATP Challenger Tour, where he won five singles titles and six doubles titles.

He reached his first ATP Tour final at the St. Petersburg Open, defeating Yuri Schukin, Oleksandr Dolgopolov Jr., Ernests Gulbis and Igor Kunitsyn before falling in the final to Stakhovsky in a third-set tiebreak.

2010: First ATP title & Grand Slam semifinal in doubles 
Zeballos started the singles season in a slump, falling in the first round four times, but had an excellent start to the doubles season. In his first tournament, the Heineken Open, Zeballos and Rogier Wassen defeated the world No. 1 team Bob and Mike Bryan. Zeballos then reached the round of 16 at the Australian Open with countryman Leonardo Mayer and reached the final at the Movistar Open with Italian Potito Starace.
Zeballos then turned to the clay in the Copa Telmex in Argentina, where in the first round, he defeated countryman and former French Open champion Gastón Gaudio. It was Zeballos' first ATP singles win since he reached the final in St. Petersburg. Zeballos next defeated former world No. 1 Carlos Moyá and reached his first ATP quarterfinal since October, where he then lost to countryman Juan Mónaco. In doubles, Zeballos and countryman Sebastián Prieto were the fourth seed and won the title against Simon Greul and Peter Luczak. It was Zeballos' first career ATP title. The following week, at the Abierto Mexicano Telcel, Zeballos lost in the first round to Łukasz Kubot. He made it to the doubles semifinals with partner Mónaco.

Zeballos was selected for the Argentine Davis Cup team for the first time. He played doubles with David Nalbandian against the Swedish pair of Robert Lindstedt and Robin Söderling. They won in straight sets. Zeballos reached a career milestone as he defeated his first-ever top-25 player, 24th ranked Gilles Simon, in the second round at the Sony Ericsson Open. He then lost in the third round to the eventual finalist Tomáš Berdych.

At the US Men's Clay Court Championships, he defeated Taylor Dent, Dudi Sela, and world No. 11 Fernando González for his first top-15 win and the biggest one of his career. He then faced eventual champion Juan Ignacio Chela in the semifinals, where he lost in straight sets.

At the US Open, Zeballos, with partner Eduardo Schwank, reached the semifinals in doubles.

2011-2012: French Open quarterfinal in doubles 
Zeballos played mostly on the Challenger circuit in singles. He did not make it past the second round in any ATP events. He had more success in doubles, where he won his second title at the 2011 BMW Open partnering Simone Bolelli.

In 2012, he made it to the semifinals in Viña de Mar and Buenos Aires. At Roland Garros, he and partner Oliver Marach made it to the quarterfinals, where they were beaten by the Bryan brothers.

2013: First ATP title & top 40 in singles, French Open doubles semifinal
Zeballos won his first ATP singles title at Viña del Mar, where he defeated Rafael Nadal in three sets in his comeback tournament. This victory made Zeballos one of the only four players who have beaten Nadal in a final on clay (the others are Roger Federer, Novak Djokovic and Andy Murray).

2014-15: Loss of form, out of singles top 100 & doubles top 50

2016: Four doubles titles
He won three doubles titles with Julio Peralta and one with Andres Molteni.

2017-18: French Open fourth round in singles & quarters in doubles, 4 more titles
Zeballos' first match in the 2017 Australian Open was a 5-hour and 15-minute loss to Ivo Karlović, the second longest match by time at the Australian Open in the Open Era.

In June 2017 at Roland Garros, he had his best performance at a Grand Slam, reaching the fourth round. He was beaten by 6th seed Dominic Thiem in straight sets. At the same tournament, he reached the quarterfinals partnering Julio Peralta.

2019-21: New partnership, US Open & Wimbledon finals, World No. 3, 4 Masters titles
Zeballos won his first ATP Masters 1000 Doubles Title at the 2019 BNP Paribas Open with Nikola Mektić. They defeated sixth-seeded Łukasz Kubot and Marcelo Melo in the final. Zeballos became the first ATP Masters doubles champion from Argentina since 1997 after Luis Lobo at the Hamburg Masters.

With his new partner Marcel Granollers, he has won 6 titles thus far, starting in August 2019, and also made his first Grand Slam doubles final at the 2019 US Open, losing to the world No. 1 and top-seeded pair Farah/Cabal. As a result, he reached a career-high ranking of world No. 3 in doubles on 9 September 2019. 

The pair won 3 Masters 1000: the 2019 Canadian Open, the 2020 Italian Open, and the 2021 Mutua Madrid Open. They also reached the 2021 Wimbledon Championships final losing to world No. 1 and top seeds Mektic/Pavic.

In August 2021, they reached a second Masters 1000 final for 2021 and fourth overall at the 2021 Western & Southern Open in Cincinnati, defeating Arévalo/Fognini. They defeated Austin Krajicek and Steve Johnson in the final to win their fourth Masters.

2022: Two Major semis, 5 Masters quarters, Third straight ATP Finals
Zebalos and Granollers qualified for their third consecutive ATP finals, having advanced to the semifinals of the year-end championships in 2020 and 2021.

Significant finals

Grand Slam tournament finals

Doubles: 2 (2 runner-ups)

Masters 1000 finals

Doubles: 5 (5 titles)

ATP career finals

Singles: 2 (1 title, 1 runner-up)

Doubles: 34 (19 titles, 15 runner-ups)

Challenger finals: 23 (12–11)

Performance timelines

Singles 
Current through 2018 Wimbledon.

Doubles
Current through the 2023 BNP Paribas Open.

References

External links

 
 
 
 

1985 births
Living people
Argentine male tennis players
Pan American Games gold medalists for Argentina
Tennis players from Buenos Aires
Sportspeople from Mar del Plata
Tennis players at the 2007 Pan American Games
Tennis players at the 2011 Pan American Games
Pan American Games medalists in tennis
Argentine people of Spanish descent
South American Games medalists in tennis
South American Games bronze medalists for Argentina
Competitors at the 2002 South American Games
Medalists at the 2007 Pan American Games
Tennis players at the 2020 Summer Olympics
Olympic tennis players of Argentina
21st-century Argentine people